La Forge, LaForge, or Laforge may refer to:
Places
 La Forge, Vosges, a commune in Vosges, France
 La Forge, Missouri, a community in the United States

People
 Claude LaForge (born 1936) a Canadian ice skater
 Ed LaForge (1935-2018), an American politician
Élodie Jacquier-Laforge (born 1978), French politician
 Frank La Forge (1879-1953), an American pianist and composer
 Louis de La Forge, a 17th-century French philosopher
 Marc Laforge (born 1968), an ice hockey player
 Harald Welte, German hacker

Fictional characters
 Geordi La Forge, a fictional character in the television series: "Star Trek: The Next Generation"

See also
 Forge (disambiguation)
 Lafarge (disambiguation)

Disambiguation pages with surname-holder lists